Sharafti (also Romanized as Sharaftī) is a village in Ahlamerestaq-e Shomali Rural District, in the Central District of Mahmudabad County, Mazandaran Province, Iran. At the 2006 census, its population was 420, in 99 families.

References 

Populated places in Mahmudabad County